Being Human is a supernatural drama television series developed for North American television by Jeremy Carver and Anna Fricke, based upon the British series of the same name created by Toby Whithouse. The series premiered on Syfy and Space Channel on January 17, 2011, with a thirteen episode first season and tells the story of Aidan (Sam Witwer) and Josh (Sam Huntington), a vampire and a werewolf respectively, who move into a new apartment only to discover that it is haunted by the ghost of a previous tenant, Sally (Meaghan Rath). Together, the three of them discover that being human is not as easy as it seems.

The fourth and final season began on January 13, 2014, and once again introduced changes to the dynamics of the group: Josh's lycanthropy curses him to be a wolf all but the night of the full moon, but Sally, who has returned from being trapped between dimensions by Donna, now has magical powers and manages to free Josh from the curse, but the spell does not go as planned and Josh's inner wolf is still present, while Aidan must now deal with his wife Suzanna, who was thought to be long dead, and Kenny, who is now heading the Boston vampires.

Cast

Main cast
 Sam Witwer as Aidan Waite
 Meaghan Rath as Sally Malik
 Sam Huntington as Josh Levison
 Kristen Hager as Nora Sargeant

Recurring cast

 Connor Price as Kenny
 Deanna Russo as Kat Neely
 Susanna Fournier as Zoe Gonzalez
 Amy Aquino as Donna Gilchrist
 Mark Pellegrino as James Bishop
 Kyle Schmid as Henry Durham
 Alison Louder as Emily Levison
 Erica Deutshman as Beth
 Imogen Haworth as Holly
 Jesse Rath as Robbie Malik
 Katharine Isabelle as Susanna Waite
 Janine Theriault as Blake
 Mylène Dinh-Robic as Caroline
 Tim Rozon as Andrew
 James A. Woods as Mark
 Stephanie Lemelin as Wendy

Episodes

References

External links 
 
 

2014 American television seasons
2014 Canadian television seasons